Daniel Thomas (born July 1, 1998) is an American football safety for the Jacksonville Jaguars of the National Football League (NFL). He played college football at Auburn.

Early life and high school
Thomas grew up in Montgomery, Alabama and attended Robert E. Lee High School. As a senior, Thomas was named first-team All-Metro and second-team ASWA Class 7A all-state after recording 87 tackles, five tackles for loss and seven interceptions, including two interceptions returned for a touchdown, while returning three punts for touchdowns. Rated a three-star recruit, Thomas was considering offers from Minnesota, Clemson, South Carolina, and North Carolina before signing with Auburn after receiving a late offer from the school on National Signing Day.

College career
Thomas played in 11 games as a true freshman, recording 16 tackles and two interceptions. Both interceptions were against rival Alabama on November 26, 2016, starting in place of linebacker, Deshaun Davis, who suffered a knee sprain the week prior against Vanderbilt, becoming the first Auburn freshman with two turnovers in one game since 2009. Thomas played safety and the nickel back, and linebacker positions as a sophomore, finishing the season with 35 tackles, two sacks, one interception and three passes defended. Thomas became a starter going into his junior season and recorded 74 tackles with five passes defended, two interceptions, two forced fumbles and a sack. Thomas is described as a "positionless" player, a short stocky defender with run stopping force and ball skills that led the Tigers to a successful 9-4 record. Thomas recorded 74 tackles, 5.5 tackles for a loss, one pass defended and one forced fumble as a senior.

Professional career
Thomas was selected by the Jacksonville Jaguars in the fifth round with the 157th pick in the 2020 NFL Draft. Jacksonville previously acquired this selection by trading Calais Campbell to the Baltimore Ravens. In Week 7 against the Los Angeles Chargers, he recorded a touchdown on a blocked punt in the 39–29 loss. 
In Week 11 against the Pittsburgh Steelers, Thomas recorded his first career interception off a pass thrown by Ben Roethlisberger and made a 53-yard return during the 27–3 loss.
He was placed on injured reserve on November 24, 2020 with an arm injury.

References

External links
Jacksonville Jaguars bio
Auburn Tigers bio

1998 births
Living people
Players of American football from Montgomery, Alabama
American football safeties
Auburn Tigers football players
Jacksonville Jaguars players